Adriana Basile (Naples,  – Naples, c. 1642) was an Italian composer and singer.

Life
She was born and died in Naples. From 1610, she worked for the  Gonzagas in Mantua. Members of her family also worked for the court, including her brothers, Giambattista Basile, a poet, Lelio Basile, a composer, and her sisters, Margherita and Vittoria, who were both singers. Her husband, Mutio Baroni, and her three children, her son Camillo, and two daughters, Leonora and Caterina were also at the court. Leonora and Caterina were both successful singers in their own right.  Claudio Monteverdi declared that Basile was a more talented singer than Francesca Caccini, who was at that time at the Medici court.

Duke Vincenzo Gonzaga awarded Basile a barony in the Monferrato, and she was also well regarded by Vincenzo's sons Francesco and Ferdinando.  While still working for the Mantuan court, she travelled to Florence, Rome, Naples, and Modena. She performed in Alessandro Guarini's Licori, ovvero L’incanto d’amore. In 1626 she retired from the service of the Gonzagas, and moved to Naples and later Rome.

None of Basile's music survives, but she is known to have improvised on poetry, including in a competition with Caccini in November 1623. A number of composers have left musical tributes in her honour, while a collection of poetic tributes, "Il teatro delle glorie", was first published in Venice in 1623 and then, in expanded form, in Naples in 1628.
It has been proposed that a painting by Antiveduto Gramatica of Santa Cecilia with two musical angels depicts Adriana's harp. The harp is decorated with the coat of arms and imprese of the Gonzaga family, and Adriana's own coat of arms.

References

Alessandro Ademollo, La bell'Adriana ed altre virtuose del suo tempo alla corte di Mantova: contributo di documenti per la sotoriam della musica in Italia nel primo quarto del seicento. Castello: Lapi, 1888.
Alessandro Ademollo, I Basile alla corte di Mantova, secondo documenti inediti o rari (1603-1628). Genova, Tipografia del R. Istituto Sordo-muti, 1885
Alessandro Ademollo, La bell' Adriana a Milano (1611), Milano: R. stabilimento musicale Ricordi [1885].
Kathryn Bosi Monteath, "Adriana’s harp: paintings, poetic imagery, and musical tributes for the Sirena di Posilippo", Imago Musicae, XXX, 2019, pp. 75–103. 
Kathryn Bosi Monteath, “6. Antiveduto Gramatica: Saint Cecilia with two angels. Portrayed instruments”, in "Marvels of sound and beauty" : Italian Baroque musical instruments, catalogue of the exhibition Florence, 12 June-4 November 207, Florence, Giunti, 2007, pp. 146–47.
Nocerino, Francesco,“Il Canzoniere di Adriana Basile: nuove considerazioni su un inedito napolitano.” Musica: storia, analisi e didattica. Contributi del XX Convegno annuale della Società italiana di musicologia. Ed. by Antoni Caroccia & Francesco Di Lernia. Foggia: Claudio Grenzi Editore (Quaderni del Conservatorio Umberto Giordano di Foggia II), 2014, p. 119–29. 
Susan Parisi. "Adriana Basile", Grove Music Online, ed. L. Macy (accessed November 5, 2006), grovemusic.com (subscription access).
Liliana Pannella, «BASILE, Andreana (Andriana), detta la bella Adriana». In : Dizionario Biografico degli Italiani, Vol. VII, Roma : Istituto della Enciclopedia Italiana, 1965 (on-line)
Vincenzo Palmisciano, «Novità per il profilo biografico di Andreana, Giovan Battista Basile e Giulio De Grazia», in Archivio Storico per le Province Napoletane, CXL dell'intera collezione, 2022, pp. 161–166.

Italian women classical composers
17th-century Italian women singers
Italian Renaissance people
Renaissance composers
1580s births
1640s deaths
17th-century Italian composers
17th-century Italian actresses
Italian stage actresses
17th-century women composers